There are many waterfalls in the Delaware Water Gap National Recreation Area, a national recreation area managed by the National Park Service in New Jersey and Pennsylvania.

List

Buttermilk Falls

Buttermilk Falls is one of the tallest waterfalls of New Jersey. A dirt road (closed to vehicles in the winter) goes past its base. The waterfall is near the north end of the Delaware Water Gap National Recreation Area in New Jersey.

Dingmans Falls

It is located at the northern end of the park. There is a beautiful boardwalk that leads you to the base of the Waterfall where you can see the  cascading drop. You can continue on up a series of stairs to the waterfall and see the entire  plunge from the birds eye view. The best time to go see this waterfall is about 24 hours after a good rain then it will be flowing fast a steady. This is most known waterfall of Delaware Water Gap National Recreation Park.

Silverthread Falls

Silverthread Falls is a waterfall that  is passed on the way to see Dingmans falls. The volume of flow is much less than of Dingmans Falls.

Factory Falls

Factory Falls is located on the George W. Childs Park Trail in Pennsylvania, it follows Dingmans Creek so you are very close to Dingmans falls. The Brooks Family ran a woolen mill from 1823 to 1832 next to this fall, the remains of the mill can be seen next to the fall. This waterfall is the first one in a set of three that is on this traill. Factory Falls drops twice and makes a 90 degree turn with the creek.

Fulmer Falls

Fulmer Falls is the second waterfall you will see on the George W. Childs Park Trail in Pennsylvania right after Factory Falls. This waterfall has a unique feature of falling in a semi-circular basin of rock and then flowing downstream. The base of this waterfall is not accessible unless the fence is jumped, this is not prohibited.

Deer Leap Falls
The third last fall of the trail of George W. Childs Park is Deer Leap Falls. There is a bridge over top of the falls that gives it a very majestic look. The fall itself can be seen from all sides well including above because the bridge allows site-seers to walk on top of the fall. There is a very large wide shallow pool at the bottom of the fall, swimming and wading are not permitted. However this does not stop a lot of people from getting into the water for a selfie. The walk back is about  before the parking area is back in view.

Bushkill Falls

This set of falls is on privately owned land, and has an admission charge. They are advertised with the slogan "The Niagara of Pennsylvania".

Raymondskill Falls

Raymondskill Falls are a series of three cascading waterfalls located on Raymondskill Creek in Pike County, Pennsylvania that is the tallest waterfall in Pennsylvania.

Van Campens Glen Falls
Van Campens Glen Falls is the terminus of the Lower Van Campens Glen trail hike near Walpack, NJ. The top of the falls features a deep, large pool that cascades down a slanted rock face. The areas surrounding the upper pool require extreme caution as this area has been responsible for numerous accidents and deaths in years past. 
 The trail itself features a densely covered hemlock ravine that hosts various delicate plants and species of wildlife. The root systems at the base of many of the hemlocks have been damaged due to high foot traffic in the area. This, in addition to storm damage and a lack of funding, has led the National Park Service and Department of the Interior to close the Lower Van Campens Glen trail indefinitely, due to public hazard, as of Spring 2019.

References

Waterfalls
Delaware River
 
 
Delaware Water Gap